Psidium is a genus of trees and shrubs in the family Myrtaceae. It is native to warmer parts of the Western Hemisphere (Mexico, Central and South America, the West Indies the Galápagos islands).

Taxonomy

This genus was described first by Linnaeus in 1753. Many of the species bear edible fruits, and for this reason several are cultivated commercially. The most popularly cultivated species is the common guava, Psidium guajava.

Fossils are known from the Paleogene of Patagonia.

Species

References

External links

 
Myrtaceae genera
Taxa named by Carl Linnaeus
Neotropical realm flora